Hongik University College of Education Affiliated High School, commonly known as Hongik University High School (홍대부고), is a high school for boys in Seongbuk District, Seoul, South Korea. It is part of a system of schools affiliated with Hongik University.

History
The school was originally Seongbuk Middle and High School, educating students from ages 13 to 19. Its origins actually date to the Japanese colonial era and was known Gyeongseong Foreign Language Academy, Gyeongseong being the old name of Seoul. In 1969, in line the "3+3" policy implemented by the government, the middle school and high school were split into separate schools. Both schools were incorporated into the Hongik Foundation (홍익학원) in 1970 and renamed accordingly to reflect its status as schools affiliated with Hongik University.

Athletics
Hongik University High School is known for its fencing and basketball teams. Its student athletes have represented South Korea in international junior-level competitions.

The basketball program was founded in 1955. The team regularly made it to the semi-finals of national tournaments but was largely overshadowed by the likes of Whimoon, Kyungbock and Yongsan High Schools and did not win its first title until the 1990s.

The fencing program was founded in 1957, just a year after the Joseon Fencing Association had been reorganized into the present-day Korean Fencing Federation. It was the first high school in the country to have its own fencing team. Previously, fencing was only available through a community sports club or private coaching.

Notable alumni
 Cho Sung-won, basketball coach and retired player
 Choi Byung-chul, retired foil fencer and 2012 Olympic silver medalist
 Kang Sang-jae, basketball player and 2017 KBL Rookie of the Year
 Kim Jung-hwan, sabre fencer and four-time Olympic medalist
 Lee Sang-min, retired basketball player and two-time KBL Most Valuable Player Award winner
 Lee Wook-jae, fencing coach
 Lim Dong-seob, basketball player
 Parc Jae-jung, singer
 Won Woo-young, retired sabre fencer and 2012 Olympic gold medalist

References

External Links
 

High schools in Seoul
Educational institutions established in 1954
Boys' schools in South Korea
Private schools in South Korea